Fâchin is a commune in the department of Nièvre in the Bourgogne-Franche-Comté Region of central France.

Population

See also
Communes of the Nièvre department
Parc naturel régional du Morvan

References

Communes of Nièvre